Bashbulyak (Başbüläk) is a rural locality (a village) in Balyshlinsky Selsoviet, Blagovarsky District, Bashkortostan, Russia. The population was 10 as of 2010. There is 1 street.

Geography 
Bashbulyak is located 26 km south of Yazykovo (the district's administrative centre) by road. Slakbash is the nearest rural locality.

References 

Rural localities in Blagovarsky District